Kallidontus is an extinct genus of conodonts.

Pyle and Barnes described the genus in 2002 from the Kechika Formation, Skoki Formation, and Road River Group (Upper Cambrian to Lower Silurian), in Northeastern British Columbia, in Canada.

Kallidontus gondwanicus is from the Late Cambrian (late Furongian) or early Ordovician (Tremadocian) of the Santa Rosita Formation in the Tilcara Range, Cordillera Oriental of Jujuy, in Argentina.

References

External links 

 

Proconodontida genera
Cambrian conodonts
Ordovician conodonts
Furongian first appearances
Tremadocian

Cambrian genus extinctions